Edward Blake Huffman known as Blake Huffman (29 April 1902 – 14 July 1985) was a Canadian farmer and politician. Huffman served as a Liberal party member of the House of Commons of Canada. Born in Blenheim, Ontario, he was a farmer by career.

Huffman was first elected at the Kent riding in the 1949 general election. He was re-elected there for successive terms in 1953 and 1957, then defeated in the 1958 election by Harold Danforth of the Progressive Conservative party.

References

External links
 

1902 births
Members of the House of Commons of Canada from Ontario
Liberal Party of Canada MPs
Canadian farmers
1985 deaths